Sokhiev is a surname. Notable people with the surname include: 

Tugan Sokhiev (born 1977), Russian-Ossetian conductor
Zaurbek Sokhiev (born 1986), Russian-Ossetian freestyle wrestler